The Vanuatu national under-20 rugby union team is Vanuatu's junior team that plays rugby union football at international level. The team competes at the Oceania Rugby Junior Trophy competition as of 2015.

See also

 Rugby union in Vanuatu

References

Rugby union in Vanuatu
National sports teams of Vanuatu